Wolfgang Speyer (born June 1, 1933) is a German classical philologist and historian of religion.  He is a professor at the University of Salzburg.

Biography
Speyer was born in 1933 in Cologne, Germany. He graduated from a Catholic boarding school in Ettal and the Dreikönigsgymnasium, a gymnasium preparatory school in Cologne. Speyer attended the University of Cologne from 1954–1958 and studied classical philology, ancient history, and philosophy. In 1958, he received his doctorate under . Speyer completed his habilitation in Classical Philology at the University of Salzburg in 1976. In 1977 he received an associate professorship and in 1987 a full professorship.

The main area of Speyer's work is the interplay between Greek and Roman traditions of antiquity, Judaism, and early Christianity.

Notable works
Speyer's 1971 work Die literarische Fälschung im heidnischen und christlichen Altertum — Ein Versuch ihrer Deutung on apocrypha, pseudepigrapha, and literary forgery in antiquity has been praised as one of the few comprehensive sources on the subject by scholar of antiquity Bart Ehrman.

References

External links
 
 Bibliography of works from the University of Salzburg

German classical philologists
German historians of religion
Historians of Christianity
Academic staff of the University of Salzburg
University of Cologne alumni
1933 births
Living people